Victaphanta atramentaria, common name the Gippsland black snail, is a species of carnivorous air-breathing land snail, a terrestrial pulmonate gastropod mollusk in the family Rhytididae.

Distribution
This species is endemic to Australia and occurs in Victoria.

References

 Shuttleworth, R.J. 1852. Diagnosen neuer Mollusken. Mitteilungen der Naturforschenden Gesellschaft in Bern 1852: 193-208
 Iredale, T. 1933. Systematic notes on Australian land shells. Records of the Australian Museum 19: 37-59
 Smith, B.J. 1970. Notes on the anatomy of Victaphanta atramentaria Shuttleworth and V. compacta Cox & Hedley, and the designation of a neotype for V. atramentaria. Journal of the Malacological Society of Australia 2: 13-21
 Laws, H.M. 1971. The chromosomes of some Australasian Paryphantidae. Malacologia 11: 217-224
 Smith, B.J. 1992. Non-Marine Mollusca. In, Houston, W.W.K. (ed.). Zoological Catalogue of Australia. Non-marine Mollusca. Canberra : Australian Government Publishing Service Vol. 8 xii 408 pp

Rhytididae
Gastropods of Australia
Gastropods described in 1852
Taxonomy articles created by Polbot